Spellbound or The One-Eyed God, is a 1916 American crime drama silent black and white film directed by Harry Harvey and produced by E.D. Horkheimer and H.M. Horkheimer. It is written by Bess Meredyth.

With another numerous films, Spellbound  appropriated the medical, legal and literary tales of hypnotic crime. Oscar Cooper, in his review for Motion Picture News, doesn't bother to comment the story and acting and he offers some praise for the lighting and photography. The Salt Lake Tribune claimed that the fantastic story did not preclude at least one nod to reality.

Cast
 Lois Meredith as Elsie York
 William Conklin as Harrington Graeme
 Bruce Smith as Major Cavendish
 Edward J. Brady as Katti Hab
 Frank Erlanger as Mematu
 Edward Peters as Azetic
 R. Henry Grey as Graham

References

External links
 
 

American crime drama films
1916 crime drama films
American silent films
American black-and-white films
Films shot in California
General Film Company
1916 films
1916 crime films
1910s American films
Silent American drama films